is a Japanese footballer who plays for J1 League club Shonan Bellmare, as a centre back.

Career
Ono was born in Jōetsu, Niigata and began his career playing for his local club Takashi FC before moving to a higher level joining Albirex Niigata in 2005. He turned professional in 2008 season. He made his professional debut on 7 June 2009 against Sanfrecce Hiroshima in the J. League Cup match.

In 2011, Ono was loaned out to J2 League club Ehime FC to gain first-team experience. He played 17 games for Ehime. Later in the season, Ono again went on a season-long loan, that time to J2 League side Shonan Bellmare. He scored the first professional goal of his career for Bellmare against FC Gifu on 20 March 2012. After two and half years loan spell, he had come back to Niigata in 2014.

Club statistics
Updated to 16 October 2022.

References

External links
Profile at Shonan Bellmare

Kazunari Ono on Instagram

1989 births
Living people
Association football people from Niigata Prefecture
Japanese footballers
Japan youth international footballers
J1 League players
J2 League players
Albirex Niigata players
Ehime FC players
Shonan Bellmare players
Association football defenders

Kazunari Ono on insatgram